A Good Day to Be Black and Sexy is a 2008 film written, directed, produced and edited by Dennis Dortch. The film was originally screened at the 2008 Sundance Film Festival and was eventually given a one-week release in one theater, earning $8,629 during its release. The film explores the subject of sexuality and relationships within the black community in this collection of six vignettes set in Los Angeles designed to shatter stereotypes about black sexuality.

Cast
Kathryn Taylor as Jeanette
Brandon Valley Jones as Tony
Chonte Harris as Helena
Marcuis Harris as D'Andre
LaKeisha Blackwell as Jade
Mylika Davis as Tamala
Allen Maldonado as Jabari
Jerome Hawkins as Julian
Natalia Morris as Meagan
Alisa Sherrod as Jill
Nana Kagga as Candi

External links

2008 films
African-American films
American independent films
Films about race and ethnicity
Magnolia Pictures films
2000s English-language films
2000s American films